In Greek mythology, Alexida (Ancient Greek: Ἀλεξίδη) was a daughter of Amphiaraus, from whom certain divinities called Elasii (in Greek, Elasioi or , i. e. the averters of epileptic fits) were believed to be descended.

Notes

References 

 Lucius Mestrius Plutarchus, Moralia with an English Translation by Frank Cole Babbitt. Cambridge, MA. Harvard University Press. London. William Heinemann Ltd. 1936. Online version at the Perseus Digital Library. Greek text available from the same website.

Women in Greek mythology

Characters in Greek mythology